The Val-de-Marne's fifth constituency is a French legislative constituency in the Val-de-Marne département (east of Paris).

Description

It is one of twelve in that département, and covers five cantons. While Champigny-sur-Marne has a secure communist majority, it is outweighed by conservative majorities in the smaller towns of Bry-sur-Marne, Le Perreux-sur-Marne and Nogent-sur-Marne. Nogent was added to the constituency as part of the 2010 redistricting of French legislative constituencies.

Historic Representation

Election results

2022

 
 
 
 
 
 
 
|-
| colspan="8" bgcolor="#E9E9E9"|
|-

2017

The election results in this constituency in 2017 were fairly typical of the nationwide results. The traditional main parties of the centre-right (LR) and of the centre-left (PS) suffered a significant decline, while the newly created party of the new President Emmanuel Macron topped the poll in the first round. Outgoing MP Gilles Carrez (LR), who was aiming for a sixth consecutive term, for once failed to finish first, but was qualified for the second round. The France insoumise candidate confirmed her party's rise as the new main force of the left by finishing third, well ahead of the Socialist Party candidate.
The results in this constituency differed between the communes (towns) that compose it, as they always do. In Communist-governed Champigny, En Marche! candidate Nadine Ret came first with 30.6%, but the Communist Party candidate was second with 19.62%, followed by the France insoumise candidate (14.79%), giving the mainstream radical left a total of 34.41%. Outgoing MP Gilles Carrez (LR) was fourth, with 13.92%. Whereas in the three centre-right-governed towns, the results were different. In Le Perreux, Gilles Carrez (the town's former mayor) was first (38.48%), Nadine Ret second (34.16%), and France insoumise candidate Raphaëlle Martinez third (8.69%). In Bry, Ret was first (41.77%), Carrez second (30.57%), and Martinez third (8.19%). In Nogent, the results were similar to Bry: Ret first (44.71%), Carrez second (28.36%) and Martinez third (8.03%).

In the second round, Gilles Carrez was narrowly re-elected with 50.5% of the votes. There was a record-high level of abstention (58.60%) and 8.30% of blank or spoiled ballots.

2012
As ever, results differed between the various communes which make up the constituency. In Champigny-sur-Marne, Dominique Adenot, the town's Communist mayor, finished first in the first round, with 30,93% - followed by Caroline Adomo (27.33%) and Gilles Carrez (22.81%). By contrast, in Bry-sur-Marne, Carrez obtained 47,33%, Adomo a result similar to that she had in Champigny (27,81%), while Adenot obtained just 5.43% (which placed him fourth, behind the National Front). Nogent-sur-Marne gave 46,92% to Carrez, 28,11% to Adomo and just 5.01% to Adenot, again placing him fourth. Le Perreux-sur-Marne gave 52,92% to Carrez, 26,13% to Adomo, and 4,93% to Adenot (fourth). The addition of Nogent to the constituency contributed to weakening the radical left.

2007

2002

1997

Sources
 Official results of French elections from 2007
 Official results of French elections from 2002
 Results of French elections from 1997 (Le Figaro)

References

5